Mosler can refer to:

 Mosler Automotive, an American supercar and race car company
 Mosler Safe Company, a defunct American safe manufacturer
 Mosler (grape), an alternative name for the Hungarian wine grape Furmint

As a surname
People whose surname is or was Mosler include:
Henry Mosler (1841–1920), United States artist
Warren Mosler (born 1949), United States economist